Handwan was a king of Hellespont mentioned in Gesta Danorum. Having lost the war against the Curonians, exiled Prince Hading attacked Handwan's kingdom and eventually captured and ransomed him. Hading used the ransom money to fund the liberation of his kingdom from the Swedish usurper.

He would have resided in the City of "Duna", which happens to be the Germanic name for Daugava and near Curonia.

Text

References

Kings in Norse mythology and legends